Oskolkovo is a rural locality (a selo) and the administrative center of Oskolkovsky Selsoviet, Aleysky District, Altai Krai, Russia. The population was 728 as of 2016. There are 10 streets.

Geography 
Oskolkovo is located 54 km southeast of Aleysk (the district's administrative centre) by road. Tolstaya Dubrova is the nearest rural locality.

References 

Rural localities in Aleysky District